Crowding (or visual crowding) is a perceptual phenomenon where the recognition of objects presented away from the fovea is impaired by the presence of other neighbouring objects (sometimes called "flankers"). It has been suggested that crowding occurs due to mandatory integration of the crowded objects by a texture-processing neural mechanism, but there are several competing theories about the underlying mechanisms. It is considered a kind of grouping since it is "a form of integration over space as target features are spuriously combined with flanker features."

Crowding has long been thought to be predominantly a characteristic of peripheral vision. Yet, while it is indeed particularly prominent there, it is present in the whole of the visual field, with only its spatial extent varying (governed by Bouma's law; see below). In particular, crowding is of utmost importance in foveal vision, overriding the importance of visual acuity in pattern recognition and reading where crowding represents the bottleneck in processing.

Crowding is prominently present in amblyopia and has been first mentioned in that context and studied quantitatively there. Crowding deficits have further been found in neuropsychiatric disorders such as schizophrenia and autism and may have clinical implications in these disorders. It is also suggested that head injuries can cause a crowding effect. Normally sighted children up to the age of about eight years further have more pronounced crowding than adults, and this may be the reason for larger print in children's books.

Bouma's law 
The extent of crowding is mostly independent of a letter's or form's size, unlike what is the case in acuity. Instead, it depends very systematically on the distance to its neighbors. If the latter is above a critical value, crowding vanishes. In 1970, Herman Bouma has described a rule-of-thumb for that critical distance, stating that it amounts to about half the eccentricity value under which the crowded letter is seen (eccentricity measured as visual angle away from the fovea's center). If, e.g., a letter is shown at 2.5 deg away from the fovea center – which is approximately at the border of the fovea – the critical distance amounts to 1.25 deg visual angle.  When the flankers are closer, crowding will thus occur.

Newer research suggests that the factor in Bouma's rule (originally ½) can vary quite a bit, and might often be a little smaller (e.g., 0.4). Furthermore, a small constant should be added in the equation, and there are further caveats. Overall, however, Bouma's rule has since proven valid over a large variety of perceptual tasks. For its robustness, it is now often considered a perceptual law, similar to other perceptual laws (like Weber's law, Riccò's law, Bloch's law).

History 
Crowding, as we know today, is – except in a few special circumstances – the essential bottleneck for human pattern recognition and can be demonstrated in the easiest of ways. It is thus striking that it has been overlooked over the centuries; the cause for degraded pattern recognition has mostly been, and still is, incorrectly ascribed to degraded visual acuity.

The percepts in peripheral vision have already been described by Ibn al-Haytham in the 11th century as "confused and obscure". Later, James Jurin in 1738 described the phenomenon of "indistinct vision" which, in two examples, could be seen as the result of crowding. In the 19th century, the ophthalmologists Hermann Aubert and Richard Förster in Breslau/Poland described the percept of two neighboring points in indirect vision as “quite strangely undefined ["ganz eigenthümlich unbestimmt"] as something black, the form of which cannot be further specified”. Note that, in none of these examples, the description is as "blurred" or "distorted", as is often (and misleadingly) seen in today's characterizations.

Crowding itself, however, i.e. the difference between singular letters and groups thereof, went unnoticed up to the 20th century. In 1924, then, the Gestalt psychologist Wilhelm Korte was the first to describe, in detail, percepts and phenomena of form perception in indirect vision (peripheral vision). Probably around that time, crowding has become an issue in optometry and ophthalmology when testing amblyopic subjects with eye charts, as is apparent from a remark of the Danish ophthalmologist Holger Ehlers in 1936. James A. Stuart und Hermann M. Burian in Iowa were, in 1962, the first to study crowding systematically, for amblyopic subjects. In foveal vision, the related phenomenon of contour interaction was described (Merton Flom, Frank Weymouth & Daniel Kahneman, 1963).

Herman Bouma, in 1970, famously found what was later called Bouma's law, yet that paper was fully neglected for many years. In the coming three decades, the phenomenon was studied in experimental psychology, under different terms. Only then, the subject of Crowding found increasingly wide attention in visual perception research (Levi et al. 1985; Strasburger et al, 1991; Toet & Levi, 1992, Pelli et al., 2004). Today, it is a major topic in vision and perception and is increasingly recognized for being the major limitation of foveal and peripheral form perception.

References

Object recognition and categorization
Visual perception
Neuroscience
Schizophrenia